Funmi Ayinke (born 27 May 1983) is a popularly known Nigerian business mogul, philanthropist, educationalist and industrialist.

Early life and education 
Ayinke was born on 27 May 1983. She attended Ladoke Akintola University of Technology, where she obtained a Bachelor of Technology (B.Tech.) degree in Mechanical engineering. She holds a master's degree in Business Administration (MBA).

Career 

Ayinke started her National Youth Service Corps program at the Ministry of Work and Housing, Gumel, Jigawa State. After nine months, she redeployed to the Works and Services Department of the Federal University of Agriculture, Abeokuta (FUNAAB), Ogun State, after which she had a brief stint at Adefun Investment, Ibadan.

She joined the Mechanical Engineering Unit of FUNAAB's Works and Services Department in February 2014. 

In 2019, after leaving FUNAAB, Ayinke established her own company, Funmi Ayinke Nigeria Limited. She also launched her own record label, Funmi Ayinke Music Record Label (FRL) in October 2021, signing three artists from Lagos. Her first time singing was in a church choir. Her first release, "It's Our Time", was inspired by the "End SARS" protests in Nigeria.

Awards and honors 
 Funmi Ayinke won two West Africa Gospel Music Awards in 2021 for the Best Inspirational Song of the Year and the Best Songwriter of the year for 2020/2021, and won the City People Magazine Awards for Best Motivational song of the Year and Songwriter of the Year.
 She was awarded the "Humanitarian of the Year 2020" award by City People.
 Ayinke became a brand ambassador for Nord Automobiles in 2022.
 Funmi Ayinke bags Peace Corps ambassadorial appointment. 
 Re-engineering Life via mechanics and music 
 Funmi Ayinke set to release EP

Personal life 
Funmi Ayinke is married with four children.

References

External links 

1983 births
Living people